Martofte is a village on the island of Funen in Denmark. It is at the end of the former railway line Odense–Kerteminde–Martofte Jernbane which closed in 1966.

Populated places in Funen
Kerteminde Municipality